Kotrabudan is a village in the municipality of Tuzi, Montenegro.

Demographics
According to the 2011 census, its population was 233, all but 5 of them are Albanians.

References

Populated places in Tuzi Municipality
Albanian communities in Montenegro